Yuttadhammo Bhikkhu (also known as Bhante Yuttadhammo; born May 22, 1979) is a Canadian Buddhist monk. He was ordained in 2001 under .

Early life
Yuttadhammo Bhikkhu was born Noah Herschell Greenspoon in Ice Lake, Manitoulin Island, Ontario, Canada.

In 1985, he began a homeschool curriculum at the discretion of his parents. In 1993, he returned to public school and enrolled in Manitoulin Secondary School. In 1996, he left the public school system again and resumed his studies at West Bay Alternative School.
He is President of the non-profit Sirimangalo International.

Education and ordination
In 2000, Yuttadhammo traveled to Thailand where he began to practice satipaṭṭhāna-vipassanā meditation at Wat Phradhatu Sri Chom Tong. He returned to Canada to study Sanskrit and Indian religions at McMaster University, later pursuing study of Pāli at University of Toronto as well as Thai Dhamma, Abhidhamma and Pali studies at Wat Phradhatu Sri Chom Tong.

In 2001, he returned to Thailand and was ordained in the Theravada tradition at Wat Phradhatu Sri Chom Tong.

He later returned to McMaster University in 2016 to study French to better communicate and connect with his audience.

Teachings
Yuttadhammo has been teaching meditation since 2003 in Thailand, Sri Lanka, the United States and Canada. He currently maintains a YouTube channel which hosts both live-streamed chatrooms and pre-recorded videos answering viewers' questions about Theravāda Buddhism.  He occasionally teaches Pāli to advanced meditators. He also facilitates a meditation website for groups and individuals.

Publications
How to Meditate: A Beginner's Guide To Peace
Lessons in Practical Buddhism
''Cakkhupālattheravatthu:The Story of The Elder Cakkhupāla, a Pali workbook
He has also been in charge of creating the following:
Digital Pali Reader (DPR)
Android Tipitaka app, both of which have been used by Pali scholars

External links
Truth Is Within: Just Another Buddhist Monk's Weblog

References

1979 births
McMaster University alumni
University of Toronto alumni
Theravada Buddhist monks
Canadian Buddhist monks
Theravada Buddhist spiritual teachers
Pali–English translators
Living people